Sophie Brown (born 12 February 1993) is a badminton player from England.

Achievements

BWF International Challenge/Series
Women's doubles

Mixed doubles

 BWF International Challenge tournament
 BWF International Series tournament
 BWF Future Series tournament

References

External links
 

1993 births
Living people
Sportspeople from Leeds
English female badminton players